Paradraculoides is a genus of hubbardiid short-tailed whipscorpions, first described by M. Harvey, O. Berry, K. Edward and G. Humphreys in 2008.

Species 
, the World Schizomida Catalog accepts the following eleven species:

 Paradraculoides affinis Framenau et al., 2018 – Australia (Western Australia)
 Paradraculoides anachoretus Harvey, Berry, Edward & Humphreys, 2008 – Australia (Western Australia)
 Paradraculoides bythius Harvey, Berry, Edward & Humphreys, 2008 – Australia (Western Australia)
 Paradraculoides catho Framenau et al., 2018 – Australia (Western Australia)
 Paradraculoides celatus Framenau et al., 2018 – Australia (Western Australia)
 Paradraculoides cochranus Framenau et al., 2018 – Australia (Western Australia)
 Paradraculoides confusus Framenau et al., 2018 – Australia (Western Australia)
 Paradraculoides eremius Abrams & Harvey, 2015 – Australia (Western Australia)
 Paradraculoides gnophicola Harvey, Berry, Edward & Humphreys, 2008 – Australia (Western Australia)
 Paradraculoides kryptus Harvey, Berry, Edward & Humphreys, 2008 – Australia (Western Australia)
 Paradraculoides obrutus Framenau et al., 2018 – Australia (Western Australia)

References 

Schizomida genera